Appiano Buonafede (1716–1793) was an Italian priest and philosopher who published under the name Agatopisto Cromaziano.

Appiano Buonafede was born in Comacchio, a Province of Ferrara, and died in Rome. He became a professor of theology while in Naples in 1740, and entering the religious body of the Celestines, rose to be general of the order in 1777.

His principal works are on the history of philosophy, though he also published a few poems and philosophic comedies.
He was “certainly not an original historian, but nor was he a simple compiler.” The most part of his compilation was based on the works of Johann Jakob Brucker and Thomas Stanley. For example, his seven-volume Della istoria e della indole di ogni filosofia di Agatopisto Cromaziano (1766-1781) was heavily dependent on the works of Brucker.

Works
 Saggio di commedie filosofiche con ampie annotazioni di A. Agatopisto Cromaziano (1754)
 Istoria critica e filosofica del suicidio ragionato di Agatopisto Cromaziano (1761)
 Delle conquiste celebri esaminate col naturale diritto delle genti (1763)
 Della istoria e della indole di ogni filosofia di Agatopisto Cromaziano, 7 vols., (1766-1781)
 Il genio borbonico, versi epici di Agatopisto Cromaziano nelle nozze auguste delle altezze reali di Ferdinando di Borbone... e di Maria Amalia... (1769)
 Della restaurazione di ogni filosofia ne' secoli, XVI., XVII., XVIII., 3 vols., (1785-1789) (German trans. by C. Heydenreich)
 Epistole tusculane di un solitario ad un uomo di città (1789)
 Storia critica del moderno diritto di natura e delle genti (1789)

References

External links 
 

18th-century Italian philosophers
1716 births
1793 deaths
Italian historians of philosophy
Celestine Order
People from Comacchio